Lewistown Municipal Airport  is two miles southwest of Lewistown, in Fergus County, Montana. It is owned by the city and county.

Federal Aviation Administration records say the airport had 596 passenger boardings (enplanements) in calendar year 2008, 1,049 in 2009 and 704 in 2010. The National Plan of Integrated Airport Systems for 2011–2015 called it as a general aviation airport (the commercial service category requires 2,500 enplanements per year).

Scheduled air service temporarily ceased on March 8, 2008, when Big Sky Airlines ended operations in bankruptcy. Great Lakes Airlines was given USDOT approval to take over Essential Air Service (EAS) and flights began in 2009.  Service was provided under EAS contract by Silver Airways (formerly Gulfstream International Airlines) until July 2013. EAS subsidies were terminated on July 15, 2013 due to subsidy per passenger exceeding $1000, leaving Lewistown without scheduled air service.

History 
Lewistown Army Airfield was built in 1942 as one of four training facilities for B-17 Flying Fortress crews and had a storage site for the top secret Norden Bombsight.

Lewistown was a satellite field for Great Falls Army Air Base. Squadrons were trained in navigation in addition to receiving gunnery and bombing practice. After training, the men were sent to the European front.

The airfield was in operation during a 12-month period between 1942 and 1943 and thereafter deactivated.  The field was declared surplus in 1948 and has been a municipal airport ever since.

The original Frontier Airlines (1950-1986) served the airport during the 1960s with direct Convair 580 turboprop flights to Denver, Salt Lake City and other destinations in the U.S. intermountain west.  Frontier also operated nonstop Convair 580 service from Lewistown to Billings and Great Falls in Montana.

Facilities
It has three asphalt runways: 8/26 is 6,100 by 100 feet (1,859 x 30 m), 3/21 is 5,600 by 100 feet (1,707 x 30 m), and 13/31 is 4,102 by 60 feet (1,250 x 18 m).

In 2011 the airport had 16,804 aircraft operations, average 46 per day: 81% general aviation, 15% air taxi, and 4% military. 58 aircraft were then based at the airport: 85% single-engine, 10% multi-engine, and 5% helicopter.

See also 

 Montana World War II Army Airfields

References 

 Essential Air Service documents (Docket OST-1997-2605) from the U.S. Department of Transportation:
 Order 2005-12-20: selecting Big Sky Transportation Co., d/b/a Big Sky Airlines, to continue providing essential air service at seven Montana communities (Glasgow, Glendive, Havre, Lewistown, Miles City, Sidney, and Wolf Point) for a new two-year period beginning March 1, 2006, at a subsidy of $6,838,934 annually.
 Order 2007-11-21: selecting Big Sky Transportation Co., d/b/a Big Sky Airlines, to continue providing essential air service at seven Montana communities for a new two-year period beginning March 1, 2008, at a subsidy of $8,473,617 annually.
 Order 2007-12-22: allowing Big Sky Transportation Co., d/b/a Big Sky Airlines, to suspend its subsidized essential air services at seven Montana communities on the date that Great Lakes Aviation, Ltd., begins replacement service, and selecting Great Lakes to provide those services at subsidy rates totaling $8,201,992.
 Order 2008-7-9: approving an alternate service pattern requested by Lewistown, Miles City and Sidney, Montana.
 Order 2011-1-27: selecting Gulfstream International Airlines, to provide subsidized essential air service (EAS) with 19-passenger Beechcraft B-1900D aircraft at Glasgow, Glendive, Havre, Lewistown, Miles City, Sidney, and Wolf Point, Montana, for a two-year period beginning when the carrier inaugurates full EAS at all seven communities through the end of the 24th month thereafter, at a combined annual subsidy rate of $10,903,854.

External links 
 Lewistown Municipal Airport, official website
 

1943 establishments in Montana
Airports established in 1943
Airfields of the United States Army Air Forces in Montana
Airports in Montana
Former Essential Air Service airports
Buildings and structures in Fergus County, Montana
Transportation in Fergus County, Montana